Mollalu (also Romanized as Mollālū; also known as Mollālar, Mollālor, and Māllālār) is a village in Angut-e Sharqi Rural District, Anguti District, Germi County, Ardabil Province, Iran. At the 2006 census, its population was 459, in 85 families.

References 

Tageo

Towns and villages in Germi County